Jono McLean (born 11 July 1980) is a South African cricketer. Born  in Johannesburg, he is a right-handed batsman and a right-arm medium-pace bowler. He made his Hampshire debut in 2005, and also played for Western Province in South Africa.

He helped Hampshire finish as runners-up in the Frizzell County Championship in 2005 behind Nottinghamshire. After the 2006 County Championship McLean was released by Hampshire.

External links
Jono McLean at CricketArchive
Jono McLean at Cricinfo

1980 births
Living people
South African cricketers
Hampshire cricketers
Western Province cricketers
Cricketers from Johannesburg
White South African people
Berkshire cricketers